The Cave of Dogs (Italian: Grotta del Cane) is a cave near Naples, Italy. Volcanic gases seeping into the cave give the air inside a high concentration of carbon dioxide. Dogs held inside would faint; at one time this was a tourist attraction.

Description
The Cave of Dogs (Italian: Grotta del Cane, literally "Cave of the Dog")) is a cave about ten metres deep on the eastern side of the Phlegraean Fields near Pozzuoli,  Naples. Inside the cave is a fumarole that releases carbon dioxide of volcanic origin.

The cave is thought to have been constructed in classical antiquity, possibly as a sudatorium; if so, the CO emissions must have been much lower at the time. It may have been known to Pliny the Elder, who, in his Natural History (written 77-79 AD), mentions a location near Pozzuoli where animals die from poisonous fumes. However, the first unambiguous reports about the cave only appear in the 16th century.

It was a tourist attraction for travelers on the Grand Tour. The CO gas, being denser than air, tended to accumulate in the deeper parts of the cave. As a result, small animals such as dogs held inside the cave suffered carbon dioxide poisoning, while a standing human was not affected. Local guides, for a fee, would suspend small animals (usually dogs) inside it until they became unconscious. The dogs could be revived by submerging them in the cold waters of the nearby Lake Agnano, although in at least one case this led to the dog drowning instead. Tourists who came to see this attraction included Sir Thomas Browne,
Richard Mead, Goethe, John Evelyn, Montesquieu, Alexandre Dumas père, and Mark Twain.

Some tourists including Washington Irving (1804), Percy Bysshe and Mary Shelley (1818) and Ralph Waldo Emerson (1833), objecting to the cruelty, refused to pay for the experiment to be performed on the dog.  A Scottish scientist who examined the cave for several days (1877) reported:

The lake became polluted, was thought to be malarious, and was drained in 1870.  At some point the spectacle fell into disuse, although Baedeker's guides in the 1880s were still advertising that to see the dog experiment would cost tourists 1 lire (≈ 20 U.S. cents).. According to one source, it was banned before World War II for cruelty to animals. The cave entrance was blocked to prevent access by children. 

In 2001 the cave was investigated by Italian speleologists.

In popular science
The cave was often described in nineteenth century science textbooks to illustrate the density and toxicity of carbon dioxide, and its reputation gave rise to a scientific demonstration of the same name, in which stepped candles are successively extinguished by tipping carbon dioxide into a transparent container.

References

External links
 Video of a scientific demonstration of the principle behind Cave of Dogs
 Report from a scientific expedition to the cave on April 28, 2013 (in Italian)

Caves of Italy
Carbon dioxide
Campanian volcanic arc
Cruelty to animals
Science demonstrations
Toxicology
Tourist attractions in Campania
Volcanism of Italy
Geotourism
Phlegraean Fields